Howard William Atherton BSC (born 12 August 1947) is an English cinematographer known for such films as Fatal Attraction, Indecent Proposal, Bad Boys, Color Me Kubrick, Lolita and Black Rain.
 
Atherton was nominated for a 1996 Emmy Award for Outstanding Cinematography for his work on the NBC miniseries adaptation of Gulliver's Travels.

References

External links

1947 births
Living people
English cinematographers
People from Ilford